Leucotrachea is a genus of moths of the family Noctuidae.

Species
 Leucotrachea leucomelanica Janse, 1937
 Leucotrachea melanobasis (Hampson, 1902)
 Leucotrachea melanodonta (Hampson, 1908)
 Leucotrachea melanoleuca (Hampson, 1902)

References
Natural History Museum Lepidoptera genus database
Leucotrachea at funet

Hadeninae